Gerolamo Politi, O.P. (died 1575) was a Roman Catholic prelate who served as Bishop of Trevico (1564–1575).

Biography
Gerolamo Politi was ordained a priest in the Order of Preachers.
On 25 October 1564, he was appointed during the papacy of Pope Pius IV as Bishop of Trevico.
He served as Bishop of Trevico until his death in 1575.

References

External links and additional sources
 (for the Chronology of Bishops using non-Latin names) 
 (for the Chronology of Bishops using non-Latin names)  

16th-century Italian Roman Catholic bishops
Bishops appointed by Pope Pius IV
1575 deaths
Dominican bishops